Artistes 414 Fund Raising Campaign was a major fund raising campaign held at the Hong Kong Coliseum in Hung Hom, Kowloon, Hong Kong for the victims of the 2010 Yushu earthquake. The concert began at 6pm of 26 April 2010 lasting until 11pm. The 414 stood for 14 April, on the day of the earthquake. The theme song is lyrics rewriting of 憑著愛 sung by Su Rui (another rewriting is 再回首 sung by 姜育恆).

Preparation
More than 300 celebrities participated in the event from both sides of the cross-strait including HK, Taiwan, People's Republic of China.  The event raised over HK$35,060,000.  Special recordings were also made by US celebrities such as Kenny G and Will Smith.  Earlier portion of the fund raiser was hosted by Eric Tsang, Carol Cheng, Sally Wu (吳小莉) and Paw Hee-ching.

Participants
The following are some of the participants.

See also
 Artistes 512 Fund Raising Campaign
 Artistes 88 Fund Raising Campaign

References

演藝界情繫玉樹關愛行動大匯演 - 大會主題曲《手連心》

Music festivals in Hong Kong
Benefit concerts
2010 in Hong Kong